In epidemiology, attributable fraction for the population (AFp) is the proportion of incidents in the population that are attributable to the risk factor. The term attributable risk percent for the population is used if the fraction is expressed as a percentage.

It is used when an exposure increases the risk, as opposed to reducing it, in which case its symmetrical notion is preventable fraction for the population.

Synonyms 
Multiple synonyms of the attributable fraction for the population are in use: attributable proportion for the population, population attributable proportion, Levin's attributable risk, population attributable risk, and population attributable fraction.

Similarly, population attributable risk percent (PAR) is used as a synonym for the attributable risk percent for the population.

Interpretation 
Attributable fraction for the population combines both the relative risk of an incident with respect to the factor, as well as the prevalence of the factor in the population. Values of AFp close to 1 indicate that both the relative risk is high, and that the risk factor is prevalent. In such case, removal of the risk factor will greatly reduce the number of the incidents in the population. The values of AFp close to 0, on the other hand, indicate that either the relative risk is low, or that the factor is not prevalent (or both). Removal of such factor from the population will have little effect. Because of this interpretation, AFp is considered useful for guiding public health policy.

For example, in 1953 Levin's paper estimated that lung cancer has a relative risk of 3.6–13.4 in smokers compared to non-smokers, and that the proportion of the population exposed to smoking was 0.5–0.96, resulting in the high AFp value of 0.56–0.92. Recently, it has been shown that the population attributable fraction for anthropogenic risk factors strongly correlates with the number of oncogenic mutations in multiple cancer types, both sexes, and three countries – US, UK and Australia.

Generalizations 
Attributable fraction for the population can be generalized to the case where the multilevel exposure to the risk factor. In such case

where is the proportion of the population exposed to the level , is the desired (ideal) proportion of the population exposed to the level , and is the relative risk at exposure level .

See also 

Population Impact Measures
Attributable fraction among the exposed

References 

Epidemiology